Anakara Büyükşehir Belediyesi Fomget Gençlik ve Spor Kulübü, formerly Fomget Gençlik ve Spor, is a Turkish women's football sports club, based in the Mamak district of Ankara and sponsored by the Ankara Metropolitan Municipality. FOMGET is short for Folklor Müzik ve Gençlik Topluluğu (Folk Dance, Music and Youth Society), a youth and sports club best known for its folk dance group. Currently, they play in the Turkcell Women's Football Super League. Club president is Taner Bozkuş.

History 
Fomget GS began playing in the Women's Regional Football League. They finished the 2009–10 season in the second position after the play-offs, and were promoted to the Turkish Women's Second Football League. In the 2011–12 season, they were admitted to the Women's First League. After two seasons, the team was relegated to the Second League. Since the 2013–14 season Fomget GS have played in the Second League. The team finished the 2018-19 Women's Second League season as champion, and was promoted to the Women's First League.

After the establishment of the Turkcell Women's Football Super League in 2021, the Metropolitan Municipality of Ankara decided to sponsor the club. Thus, the club's name changed to Ankara Büyükşehir Belediyesi Fomget Gençlik ve Spor.

Stadium 
Fomget GS play their home matches at Batıkent Stadium in Yenimahalle district of Ankara. The stadium's ground is covered by artificial turf.

Statistics 

(1): Season discontinued due to COVID-19 pandemic in Turkey
(2): Finished Group C 2nd after play-offs
(3): Season in progress

Current squad 
.,

Head coach:  Fahri Bayraktar

Kit history

Squads

References 

 
Association football clubs established in 2009
2009 establishments in Turkey